San Jacinto is an unincorporated community in Bigger Township, Jennings County, Indiana.

History
A post office was established at San Jacinto in 1852, and remained in operation until it was discontinued in 1906. The name of the community commemorates the Battle of San Jacinto.

Geography

References

Unincorporated communities in Jennings County, Indiana
Unincorporated communities in Indiana